Unexpected Guest may refer to:


Film
 An Unexpected Guest, a 1909 silent film
 Unexpected Guest (film), a 1947 Hopalong Cassidy Western
 Unexpected Guest (1997 film), a 1997 film short
 Unexpected Guest (2010 film), a 2010 comedy film short

Literature
 The Unexpected Guest (play), a 1958 Agatha Christie play
 The Unexpected Guest (novel), a 1999 Charles Osborne novelization of a 1958 Agatha Christie play

Music
 Unexpected Guests, a 2009 Hip Hop album by MF DOOM
 The Unexpected Guest, a 1982 album by Demon

See also
 Unexpected Guest at a Cancelled Party, a 2007 New Wave album by the band Spoons